Baczyn  is a village in the administrative district of Gmina Budzów, within Sucha County, Lesser Poland Voivodeship, in southern Poland.

The village has a population of 840.

References

Baczyn